{{Infobox writer 
| name         = Rogi Wieg
| image        = Rogi Wieg , dichter, Bestanddeelnr 933-8572.jpg
| imagesize    = 225px
| caption      = Rogi Wieg (1987)
| birth_name   = Robert Gabor Charles Wieg
| birth_date   = 
| birth_place  = Delft, Netherlands
| death_date   = 
| death_place  = Amsterdam, Netherlands
| nationality  = Hungarian
| occupation   = Poet, writer
| period       = 1981–2015
| notableworks =  
| awards       = {{Plainlist |
 1987 – Lucy B. and CW van der Hoogt Prize for  Magic Wire dagverdrijf 
 1988 –  Charlotte Köhler Scholarship for  The sea has no manners 
 2004 – Choice Club Poetry Club, publisher of  Awater  on  The Other 
 2008 –  Poetry Awards, winning work:  No revolver  from  Comb 
 2014 – Rogi Cradle's poem 'Slow gone black flower fields was recorded in  The 100 best poems chosen by Ahmed Aboutaleb for the VSB Poetry 2014 }}
| influences   =  
| influenced   =  
| spouse        =  
| children      =  
}}
Robert Gabor Charles "Rogi" Wieg (also spelled Vig; 21 August 1962 – 15 July 2015) was a Dutch poet, novelist and musician.

Biography
Robert Gabor Charles Wieg was born on 21 August 1962 in Delft in the Netherlands. His parents had fled from Hungary in 1956 and had settled in the Netherlands a year later.

Wieg was trained in classical music during his youth, but at the age of sixteen, he started to favor blues music and Dutch chanson. He has worked for Liesbeth List. Wieg was the editor of the literary magazines Tirade and Measure. He was a poetry critic for Het Parool between 1986 and 1999. In 1999, Wieg began with painting and drawing. As an artist he was self-taught. Together with Mari Alföldy, Wieg translated poetry from Hungarian.

His life was marked by severe depression. He was regularly admitted to psychiatric hospitals to undergo electroshock therapy and he attempted suicide three times.

On 29 December 2014 Wieg married the artist Abys Kovács, who illustrated the poems of Khazarenbloed''.

Wieg died on 15 July 2015 in Amsterdam at the age of 52. He had opted for euthanasia because of unbearable psychological and physical suffering.

References

External links
 
 Dbnl-profiel

1962 births
2015 deaths
20th-century Dutch poets
Dutch male poets
People from Delft
20th-century Dutch male writers
Deaths by euthanasia
20th-century pseudonymous writers